The Eternal derby of Slovenian football, simply known as the Eternal derby or Slovenian derby, is a football rivalry between NK Maribor and NK Olimpija Ljubljana. The match between the two rivals was first contested on 24 October 2007 in a quarter-final match of the Slovenian Cup, which was won by Maribor 3–1.

History and rivalry culture
Olimpija was founded in March 2005 under the name NK Bežigrad. They later changed their name twice, first to NK Olimpija Bežigrad and finally to NK Olimpija Ljubljana. Although the board of the newly established club and its fans see the team as the spiritual continuation of the old club, they are not regarded as the legal successors of the old NK Olimpija by the Football Association of Slovenia.

However, because the new Olimpija is supported by most of the fans of the previous Olimpija, including their ultras group, Green Dragons, who have a long-standing rivalry with Maribor's own ultras group Viole Maribor, many see the matches between Maribor and the new club as the continuation of the rivalry and refer to it by the same name. The first match between NK Maribor and the new NK Olimpija took place on 24 October 2007 in a Slovenian Cup quarter-final match, won by Maribor 3–1. At the time, Olimpija was still competing under the name NK Olimpija Bežigrad.

Fans
Besides the city of Maribor itself and the surrounding area, NK Maribor also has a large fan base in the whole regions of Lower Styria and Slovenian Carinthia. Olimpija on the other hand inherited much of the fan base that belonged to the dissolved club and draws much of its fans from the central part of the country, the majority from the city of Ljubljana with the surrounding area of southern Upper Carniola and northwestern Lower Carniola. Overall, the two clubs were always the most popular football clubs in the country.

Both clubs always have support on their matches from ultras groups called Viole Maribor, supporting NK Maribor, and Green Dragons who supports NK Olimpija. The two groups are among the largest in the country and it is not uncommon that the matches between the two clubs were sometimes interrupted by clashes between the two groups or with the police. On many occasions, before or after the matches, the fans of the two clubs would also meet up and fight on the streets. One of the worst incidents, in April 2010 after a match, resulted in a stabbing of a member of the Green Dragons who, with a group of friends, got into a fight with members of the Viole in Ljubljana's railway station. However, to date, there has not been any fatalities in the country related to football violence. Fans of Olimpija traditionally occupy the northern stands of the stadiums, while Maribor fans are present on the southern stands.

Honours
Official statistics of honours won by NK Maribor and NK Olimpija as treated by the Football Association of Slovenia.

Head-to-head

Matches

Slovenian PrvaLiga

• Total: Maribor 21 wins (38%), 22 draws (40%), Olimpija 12 wins (22%).

Slovenian Cup

• Series won: Maribor 4 (57%), Olimpija 3 (43%).

Slovenian Supercup

• Series won: Maribor 2 (100%), Olimpija 0 (0%).

Statistics
The table below is accurate as of match played 19 February 2023.

League ranking
The head-to-head ranking table shows the results of NK Maribor and NK Olimpija, when they played in the same division.

• Total: Maribor 11 times higher (85%), Olimpija 2 times higher (15%).

Notes

References

Football derbies in Slovenia
NK Maribor
NK Olimpija Ljubljana (2005)